Codex Ephesinus, minuscule 71 (in the Gregory-Aland numbering), ε 253 (von Soden), is a Greek minuscule manuscript of the New Testament, on parchment, illuminated, and elegantly written. It is dated by the colophon to 1160. In the 15th century the manuscript was prepared for liturgical use. The scribal errors are not numerous, but it has many textual divergences from the common text. The Greek text of the codex is a representative of the Byzantine text-type, but the textual character of the codex is disputed by scholars since the 19th century.

It has full marginalia with marks of the text's division, with liturgical notes and scholia. Only one leaf of the codex had lost.

The manuscript was brought to England in 1675 by Philip Traherne, English Chaplain at Smyrna, who made first collation of its text. The collation was corrected by Scrivener in 1845. It was called Codex Ephesinus, because of place of its origin.

It is currently housed in the library of the Lambeth Palace (528), at London.

Description 

The codex contains almost complete text of the four Gospels on 265 parchment leaves (size ). The leaves are arranged in small quarto. Only one leaf of the codex had lost, containing Matthew 14:13-15:16, before it was examined by Philip Traherne.

The text is written in one column per page, 20-26 lines per page in an elegant minuscule letters. The large initial letters in red.
The breathings (rough breathing, smooth breathing) and accents are given correctly, in spite of some not numerous but evident errors (e.g. αὑριον, ἐστη, ἀλωπηξ, ἀλεκτωρ, αποστελλῶ).

There is also another division according to the smaller and more ancient Ammonian Sections (in Matthew 356, in Mark 234, in Luke 342, in John only 219 sections), with references to the Eusebian Canons (written below Ammonian Section numbers).

In the 15th century lectionary markings were added at the margin and the manuscript was prepared for the church service. Every Gospel passage used for church reading is marked at the beginning by αρχαι and at the end by τελη. It has some scholia at the margin.

Movable nu is rare, and the few errors of itacism are of the common kind. It has Iota subscriptum in a few places (e.g. Luke 10:28; 22:23; 23:43; John 5:4), but not Iota adscriptum. It has also some grammar forms, which usually occur in Alexandrian manuscripts: θυγατεραν (Luke 13:16), ειπαν (19:25), πεσατε (23:30), ηγαπησες (17:26), μελαινα (Matthew 5:36), πτερνα (John 13:18). The accusative is often put for the dative after λεγω (e.g. Matthew 8:21; 10:1; Mark 12:38; Luke 5:14). The manuscript uniformly use βαραβας, κηππος, κηππουρος (for βαραββας, κηπος, κηπουρος).

Many clauses are omitted by the error of homeoteleuton (clauses with similar endings).

Text 

Scholz had noted that "familiae plerumque adhaeret Constantinopolitanae" (today this family is called as the Byzantine text-type). Scrivener opposed that Scholz missed many remarkable readings of the codex, so his opinion is not reliable, but Tischendorf confirmed Scholz's opinion that it represents Constantinopolitanian text.

Hermann von Soden classified it to the textual group Iφr. Kurt Aland did not place it in any Category, but classified it to the textual family Family 1424.

John Mill found some textual resemblance to minuscule 29. Scrivener found its textual resemblance to minuscule 692,
Caspar René Gregory to minuscule 248.

According to Scrivener there are a few Greek manuscripts of the New Testament from the 12th century "will be found to equal it in weight and importance". The manuscript presents "a text full of interest, and much superior to that of the mass manuscripts of its age". According to Gregory text of the manuscript is good.

According to the Claremont Profile Method it represents textual cluster M27 in Luke 1, Luke 10, and Luke 20, as a core member. To this cluster belong also manuscripts like Minuscule 569, 692, 750.

It has many unique textual variants (e.g. Matthew 16:11; Luke 6:49; 10:24; 19:21), many of them are supported by manuscripts like Codex Vaticanus, Codex Bezae, Codex Cyprius, and Lectionary 183. Sometimes it stands alone or nearly alone among manuscript examined by Scrivener (Luke 10:22; 17:26; 24:18.27; John 1:42; 2:17; 3:25; 8:3; 12:2). 
The text has many corrections made by a later hand.

In Matthew 1:11 it has additional reading τον Ιωακιμ, Ιωακιμ δε εγεννησεν (of Joakim, and Joakim was the father of). The reading is supported by Codex Campianus, Koridethi, manuscripts of the textual family f1, Minuscule 17, 33, 70, and 120; the reading was cited by Griesbach in his Novum Testamentum Graece.

In Matthew 16:11 it reads σαδδουκαιων και φαρισαιων for φαρισαιων και σαδδουκαιων; this phrase in the same word order gave second corrector to Codex Ephraemi Rescriptus.

In Matthew 17:14 it reads τω Ιησου for αυτω; the reading is supported only by a few manuscripts.

In Matthew 19:12 it has additional reading δια την βασιλειαν των ουρανων ευνουχισαν εαυτους; it is not supported by other manuscripts.

In Luke 6:49 it has reading επι της γης for επι την γην; the reading has only grammar meaning.

History 
According to the colophon (in red), on folio 263 verso, the manuscript was written in ετει απο χριστου ᾳρξ (1160 year from Christ), but ᾳρξ (1160) was overwritten by later hand, the real year was σχξη (868). It means it was written in 1160 A.D.

The manuscript once belonged to the Archbishop of Ephesus. It was brought to England in 1675 by Philip Traherne, English Chaplain at Smyrna in 1669-1674. In 1679 the manuscript was presented by him to the Lambeth Palace Library, along with collation, where it is held to the present day (shelf number 528).

Philip Traheron made first collation and description of the codex. According to Scrivener it was careful collation, but Traheron never before examined manuscripts and his notes shew his ignorance of textual criticism. He bent his attention to its illustration. He has neglected to distinguish readings of prima manu from the corrections made by later hand, both in the text and margin, but Scrivener very seldom detected him in absolute error. Several transcripts of Traherons collation were made, two of them were still available for Scrivener (Burney 24 and Lambeth 528b). Scrivener did not examine them.

John Mill used collation of Traheron in his edition of the Greek New Testament (1709), but very carelessly. John Mill called it Codex Ephesinus. It was added on the list Greek New Testament manuscripts by Wettstein, who gave for it number 71. Wettstein saw the codex and its collation in 1746 and wrongly deciphered date of the colophon as 1166. Griesbach hesitated between dates 1160 or 1166. Griesbach in his edition of the Greek New Testament cited 5 of its readings of the codex and Scholz only 3 readings in first six chapters of the Gospel of Matthew. Scrivener enumerated 29 various readings in the first six chapters of Matthew.

Scrivener in 1845 used collation of Traheron and compared with the text of the manuscript, and revised it, in regard to changes made by later correctors. Gregory saw the codex in 1883.

The manuscript is not cited in Novum Testamentum Graece and in editions of United Bible Societies.

See also 

 List of New Testament minuscules
 Biblical manuscript
 Textual criticism

References

Further reading 

  (as g)

External links 
 Minuscule 71 at the Encyclopedia of Textual Criticism

Greek New Testament minuscules
12th-century biblical manuscripts